Nalmexone (INN) (code names EN-1620A, UM-592), or nalmexone hydrochloride (USAN), is a semisynthetic, opioid partial agonist or mixed agonist-antagonist with both analgesic and narcotic antagonist properties that was never marketed. In clinical studies it was found to have comparable analgesic efficacy to morphine, though with several-fold reduced potency. In addition, nalmexone's side effects, the most common of which were sleepiness and sweating, were reported to be similar to those of morphine, albeit with a noticeably higher degree of incidence.

Synthesis

See also
 Nalbuphine
 Oxymorphone
 Naloxone
 Naltrexone
 Pentazocine

References

Tertiary alcohols
Alkene derivatives
Analgesics
4,5-Epoxymorphinans
Mu-opioid receptor agonists
Mu-opioid receptor antagonists
Semisynthetic opioids